Resins are hydrocarbon secretions of many plants, particularly coniferous trees.

Resin may also refer to:
 
 Ion-exchange resin, an insoluble matrix (or support structure) normally in the form of small beads fabricated from an organic polymer substrate
 Reactive resin, a material used in some bowling ball coverstocks
 Resin, a common name for hashish, a drug made from the resin of cannabis
 Small spherical polymer beads used in synthetic chemistry, specifically solid-phase synthesis
 Synthetic resin, an artificial chemical substance which hardens irreversibly, usually a thermosetting plastic or one of the monomeric components thereof

Other uses
 Resin or Rezin,  the name of the last known king of Ancient Syria
 Vladimir Resin (born 1936), appointed acting mayor of Moscow on 28 September 2010
 "Resin", a song by In Flames from the album Colony 
 Resin (software), Caucho's Java servlet container, application server and PHP server
 Resin (film), a 2001 American drama film